Onișcani is a commune in Călărași District, Moldova. It is composed of three villages: Hîrbovăț, Onișcani and Sverida.

At the 2014 census, the population was 1799. In 2004, it was divided as follows: 1334 in Onișcani, 792 in Hîrbovăț and 84 in Sverida.

References

Communes of Călărași District